Röthlisberger is a surname. Notable people with the surname include:

Hans Röthlisberger (born 1923), Swiss glaciologist
Jürg Röthlisberger (born 1955), Swiss judoka
Kurt Röthlisberger (born 1951), Swiss football referee
Ursula Röthlisberger, Swiss scientist
Nadia Röthlisberger-Raspe (1972–2015), Swiss curler

See also
Roethlisberger (surname)

Swiss-German surnames